Naval Hormusji Tata (30 August 1904 – 5 May 1989) was an adopted son of Sir Ratanji Tata and a noted alumnus of the Tata Group. He is the father of Ratan Tata, Jimmy Tata and Noel Tata.

The Naval Tata Hockey Academy in Jamshedpur (joint initiative of Tata Trusts and Tata Steel) and Odisha Naval Tata Hockey High Performance Centre in Bhubaneswar (three-pronged program between Tata Trusts, Tata Steel and Government of Odisha) are named in honour of Naval Tata's contribution to the development of hockey in India.

Early life

Naval was born in Surat on 30 August 1904 to a middle-class  family. His father, a Spinning Master in the Advanced Mills at Ahmedabad, died in 1908 after which the family relocated to Navsari, where they lived modestly. His mother’s income was derived from embroidery work. Young Naval was later boarded at the J. N. Petit Parsi Orphanage by family friends, in an effort to help support them.

In a fortunate turn of events, which changed Naval's fortune and life, Navajbai, wife of Ratanji Tata, adopted him from the orphanage. Naval was 13 when he was adopted by Lady Tata. Naval later graduated from Bombay University in Economics and proceeded to London for a short course in Accounting.

He never forgot his past and once remarked:

Family
Naval's first wife was Sooni Commissariat; they had two sons, Ratan and Jimmy. The couple separated in the mid-1940s.

Naval later married Simone Dunoyer, a businesswoman from Switzerland, they got married in 1955. Noel Tata is their son.

Career

Tata group
In 1930, he joined the Tata Sons as a despatch clerk-cum-assistant secretary and soon rose to be the Assistant Secretary of Tata Sons Ltd. In 1933, he became the Secretary to the Aviation Department and five years later, he joined as an executive in the Textiles Department. In 1939 he became the Joint Managing Director of the Tata Mills — the controlling company of the textile mills run by Tatas and became its Managing Director in 1947.  On 1 February 1941, he became a Director of Tata Sons.  He took over as the Managing Director of Tata Oil Mills Co Ltd in 1948. He was also the chairman of the Ahmedabad Advance Mills, a Tata Group company based at Ahmedabad.

Over the years he became Chairman of the other textile mills and the three electric companies. From an active director he later became the Deputy Chairman of Tata Sons. He was directly responsible for the management of the three Tata electric companies, the four textile mills and the Sir Ratan Tata Trust. He was the longest serving colleague and close associate of JRD Tata on board of Tata Sons.

Other companies
He also served as a director of Bank of Baroda with Tulsidas Kilachand, Rameshwar Das Birla, Arvind Mafatlal and others.

Other activities
Naval Tata went on to become an internationally recognised authority in labour relations, becoming a member of the International Labour Organization's governing body in 1949. His involvement with the International Labour Organisation for over three decades was very fruitful for India. Naval holds the record of being elected to the governing body of the International Labour Organization thirteen times. He was founder of ILO's family planning programme.  He is author of reports like — In Pursuit of Industrial Harmony: An Employer's Perspective by Naval H. Tata (1976), A Policy for Harmonious Industrial Relations (1980), On Wage Problem and Industrial Unrest by Naval H. Tata, C. V. Pavaskar, B. N. Srikrishna (1982)

In 1966, he had been appointed a member of the Labour Panel of the Planning Commission set up by the Union Government.

He contributed to sports, was associated with a host of other activities, and held senior offices in social, educational and welfare work. He was President of Indian Hockey Federation for fifteen years and was at helm when Indian hockey team won Olympic Gold in 1948, 1952 and 1956.

He served many other institutes like the Indian Institute of Science, the Bombay State Social Welfare Council, Swadeshi League, and the National Safety Council.

As a philanthropist, the Indian Cancer Society was established in 1951 by Naval Tata and Dr. D. J. Jussawalla, which is India's first voluntary, non-profit, national organisation for awareness, detection, cure and survivorship of those affected with this disease. He served as Chairman of the Indian Cancer Society for over 30 years.

He was also the President of the Auxiliary Forces Welfare Association and trustee of several philanthropic trusts.

He was President of the Employers Federation of India for several years. Having been associated with the organisation for four decades, on his retirement as its President, he was made its "President Emeritus".

Politics
He differed in opinion with his cousin and long standing colleague, JRD Tata. While JRD wanted to steer clear of politics, Naval stood as an independent candidate from South Bombay in 1971 but lost elections.

Awards
Naval was awarded the Padma Bhushan by the President of India on Republic Day, 1969. The same year he was given recognition for his role in industrial peace and awarded the Sir Jehangir Ghandy Medal. He was conferred the life membership of the National Institute of Personnel Management.

Death
He died on 5 May 1989 due to cancer in Bombay.

Memorials
Indian Institute of Social Welfare and Business Management has named the Sports Management Department as The Naval Tata Centre of Excellence in Sports Management in his memory.
Naval Tata Memorial Lecture is organised by National Institute of Personnel Management every year in his memory since 1992.
 In 2004, the Tata group organised 'The Century of Trust' exhibition in various cities jointly in memory of Jamsetji Tata, JRD Tata and Naval Tata.
Employers' Federation of India  launched the 'Naval Tata Institute for Training in Industrial Relations' in 2014 as a memorial to him.
In 1999 a book in his memory Naval Tata remembered was published containing compilation of letters, writings, speeches of Naval.
In 2019, Government of Odisha, Tata Steel & Tata Trusts (Hockey Ace foundation) launched Hockey HPC in Bhubaneswar, Odisha. It was named as Odisha Naval Tata Hockey High Performance Centre to pay tribute to Naval Tata for his significant contribution in development of Hockey in India.

References

1904 births
1989 deaths
Naval
Tata Group people
Recipients of the Padma Bhushan in social work
Indian businesspeople in textiles
Indian industrialists
Businesspeople from Mumbai
English-language writers from India
University of Mumbai alumni
People from Navsari district
Parsi people from Mumbai
Indian sports executives and administrators
20th-century Indian educational theorists
20th-century Indian philanthropists